Ockert Stefanus "Okkie" Terblanche (born 10 July 1952) is a South African politician and retired police general serving as the Shadow Deputy Minister of Police since June 2019. He has been a Member of the National Assembly since May 2019. He represented the Western Cape in the National Council of Provinces (NCOP) from October 2015 to May 2019. Terblanche is a member of the Democratic Alliance (DA).

Career
Terblanche was a police officer of the South African Police Service (SAPS) and served as a major general until 2010. He relocated to the town of Mossel Bay and campaigned for the DA during the 2011 South African municipal elections. He was later elected chair of the DA branch in ward 10 of the municipality.

In October 2015, the DA caucus in the Western Cape Provincial Parliament nominated him to become a party representative in the NCOP, the upper house of the South African parliament. He was confirmed as a permanent delegate on 15 October. He served as a permanent delegate until the 2019 general election when he was elected to the lower house, the National Assembly. DA parliamentary leader Mmusi Maimane appointed him as the Shadow Deputy Police Minister on 5 June 2019. John Steenhuisen was elected parliamentary leader in October 2019. He kept Terblanche in his position.

In February 2022, Terblanche was appointed as electoral head of the DA's Oudtshoorn constituency.

References

External links
M.Gen Ockert Stefanus Terblanche – Parliament of South Africa

Living people
Afrikaner people
1952 births
Members of the National Assembly of South Africa
Members of the National Council of Provinces
Democratic Alliance (South Africa) politicians
People from Mossel Bay
South African police officers